Group Captain Kambampati Nachiketa Rao, VM is a retired officer of the Indian Air Force. While carrying out an Airstrike on Pakistani positions in Batalik  sector during the Kargil War, he was shot down and captured  on 27 May 1999 by a Pakistani Unit led by Capt Rao Tahseen Ali. Nachiketa ejected from his MiG-27L and was held in Pakistani custody. He is presently a Captain at Indigo Airlines.

Early life
Nachiketa was born on 31 may 1973 to Sri. K. R. K. Sastry and Smt. K. Laxmi. He studied at Kendriya Vidyalaya in Delhi, and joined the National Defence Academy, Khadakwasla.

Kargil War
During the Kargil War, Nachiketa was a Flight Lieutenant and a Mikoyan MiG-27 pilot from No. 9 Squadron IAF (Wolfpack) who took part in a strike in the Batalik Sector on 26 May 1999. Armed with 80mm rockets and the aircraft's 30mm cannon, Nachiketa attacked an enemy position. During the operation, the aircraft took a hit from a Pakistan army MANPADS and Nachiketa was forced to eject.

After ejecting, Nachiketa evaded immediate capture but after two to three hours, a Pakistani army patrol captured him. Nachiketa continued to fire his service pistol till he ran out of bullets and was arrested. He was taken to a prison in Rawalpindi where he was beaten up by Pakistani soldiers until a senior officer intervened. Speaking to NDTV in 2016, Nachiketa said, "The jawans who had captured me were trying to manhandle me and maybe trying to kill me because, for them, I was just an enemy pilot who had fired on their locations from the air... Fortunately, the officer who came was very mature. He realised the situation that I am now a captive and now I need not be handled that way. So he was able to control them, which was a big effort because they were very aggressive at that stage."

Life as a prisoner
Nachiketa remained in the custody of Pakistani forces for eight days. He was first taken to an undisclosed location in the Batalik. After a two-hour wait, he was taken by helicopter to Skardu.

He was interrogated by the Director of Operations of the Pakistan Air Force, Group Captain Kaiser Tufail. This interrogation was called "very civil" by Tufail, who said it was a casual talk between two officers rather than the captor and a POW. Tufail said his mandate was to inquire the circumstances of the ejection and the mission.

Repatriation
Nachiketa was repatriated to India on 3 June 1999. He was handed over to the International Committee of the Red Cross in Pakistan and was subsequently repatriated over the Indian border check post at Attari on the Amritsar-to-Lahore road. Nachiketa described his experiences in captivity as "difficult to be described in words" and said he felt "death would have been a better solution".

Subsequent career
Nachiketa was promoted to Group Captain and flew Ilyushin Il-78 mid-air refuelling transport aircraft with No. 78 Squadron IAF stationed at Agra. He suffers from long-term back pain due to injury sustained during the parachute landing while he lost his MiG-27 in an engine flame out when he was shot down over Pakistan during the 1999 Kargil conflict

References

1973 births
Living people
Indian Air Force officers
Indian aviators
People of the Kargil War
Indian prisoners of war
Kendriya Vidyalaya alumni
Recipients of the Vayu Sena Medal
Shot-down aviators
Prisoners of war held by Pakistan